@Work Cycling Team was a Dutch  professional cycling team, which competed in elite road bicycle racing events such as the UCI Women's Road World Cup.

Major wins
2004
Stage 3 Novilon Internationale Damesronde van Drenthe, Bertine Spijkerman

2005
Stage 4 Trophée d'Or Féminin, Bertine Spijkerman
Stage 4 Tour Féminin de Bretagne, Bertine Spijkerman

2006
Stage Tour de Bretagne Féminin, Andrea Bosman
Overall Novilon Internationale Damesronde van Drenthe, Loe Markerink
Stage 2, Loe Markerink

References

Cycling teams based in the Netherlands
UCI Women's Teams
Cycling teams established in 2004